Ellen Spijkstra (born 3 August 1957) is a Dutch ceramic artist and photographer, resident in Curaçao.

Biography 
Ellen Spijkstra was educated at the Academie Minerva in Groningen. In 1980 she moved to Curaçao with her husband, Eric de Brabander. In 1985–1986 she took a summer course in glassblowing at the Rochester Institute of Technology in the Rochester, New York metropolitan area, followed by theory courses in clay and glaze studies and kiln construction as part of the Master of Fine Arts Ceramics program. After this year-long hiatus, she settled permanently in Curaçao. She established the ceramics studio Girouette and gave ceramics courses until 2012. Photography was initially only a hobby but after winning a local photography competition in 1985, she developed into a dual talent. In 1991 she completed a photography course at the New York Institute of Photography.

Spijkstra draws much of her inspiration from Curaçao's natural environment. She combines her ceramics with rock and coral fragments and integrates photos of corals in her ceramics. Her main themes are land and water, life and decay. She creates ceramic pieces on a variety of scales, ranging from small to monumental, and prefers to work on series.

Spijkstra has taught at, among others, the Instituto Buena Bista in Curaçao, the Ateliers '89 in Aruba and the Taller Escuela Arte Fuego in Caracas. As an artist-in-residence she worked at the Taller Varadero in Cuba (seventh Havana Biennale), the Resen International Ceramic Colony in Resen and the Shangyu Celadon Modern International Ceramic Center in Shangyu, China.

Spijkstra's work is held, among other museums, in the collection of the Curaçaosch Museum.

She is a member of the International Academy of Ceramics.

Publications
Global Local: Ellen Spijkstra Ceramics and Photography. Harderwijk: d'jonge Hond, 2008. With texts by Saskia Meijer and Marjan Unger. .

Solo exhibitions 
 1988 Ceramic sculptures and photographs, Het Curaçaosch Museum
 1989 Ellen Spijkstra, Taller Escuela Arte Fuego, Caracas
 1993 Lustrum Prijs, Curaçaosch Museum, Curaçao
 2000 Curaçao Harbor Tour, 
 2003 Passage of Time, Art Studio Insight, Aruba
 2004 Waterwerk, Dutch Maritime Museum, Amsterdam
 2008 Kleurgamma Downtown, Amsterdam
 2008 Photoimagen, The French Embassy Gallery, Santo Domingo
 2008 Global Local, Galerie Bloemhof, Curaçao
 2009 Ellen Spijkstra, Photography and Ceramics, Galerie Taptoe, Brussels
 2013 Oud en Nieuw, Avila Beach Hotel, Curaçao
 2015/18 Open Atelier Route, Studio Girouette, Curaçao
 2019 Ellen Spijkstra – An artistic journey, Het Curaçaosch Museum, Curaçao

Awards 
 1985 First Prize, photo competition 'Inner Wheel', Curaçao 
 1989 Third Prize, international photo competition 'Architecture', New York Institute of Photography, USA
 1990 Award of Merit, international photo competition 'Romance', New York Institute of Photography, USA
 1993 Curaçao Museum Lustrum Prize, Curaçao
 1999 Honorable Mention Arte '99, Curaçao
 2000 Award final selection, Sixth Taiwan Golden Ceramics Awards Exhibition; the opening exhibition of the new Taipei County Yingko Ceramic Museum, Taiwan
 2014 Best Work of Art Tile, Elit-Tile 2014/2015, Premio Fundación Susana de Moya, Dominican Republic
 2015 Honorable Mention, Gyeonggi International Ceramic Biennale 2015, South Korea

Ceramics

Photography

References 
 This article was translated from this version of the article on NL Wikipedia.

General references

External links 
 

1957 births
Living people
20th-century Dutch women artists
21st-century Dutch women artists
Dutch ceramists
Dutch photographers
Dutch women ceramists
Dutch women photographers
Curaçao artists
People from Hattem
20th-century ceramists
20th-century Dutch photographers
21st-century ceramists
21st-century Dutch photographers